Paul Conroy (born 14 June 1949) is an English music executive with a long and varied career of managing labels. He went from general manager of pioneering indie Stiff to senior positions with majors like Virgin Records, WEA, and EMI.

Life and career

Birth 
Paul Conroy was born in Surbiton Hospital in Surbiton and Esher, Surrey, England. His father, Dennis Charles Conroy, was a police officer. His mother was Muriel Conroy (late Eckett, formerly Hutcheson). He grew up in Tolworth.

School, family life, and career in the music industry 
Paul Conroy studied at Newman University in the 1960s to become a teacher. His's introduction to the music business came as a college social secretary in the early 1970s. His first job was working as a booking agent for the Charisma Agency, where he worked with Nigel Kerr. Together, they built the agency up into a major force on the burgeoning pub rock scene. In 1975, they collaborated with Jake Riviera to put on the Naughty Rhythms package tour, with pub rock stalwarts Kokomo, Dr. Feelgood, and Chilli Willi and the Red Hot Peppers. Conroy became the manager of The Kursaal Flyers, who got signed to Jonathan King's UK Records and had a hit with the song "Little Does She Know". In an idiosyncratic twist that presaged the common touch of many of his later promotional successes, Conroy had the band perform on Top of the Pops surrounded by laundry machines and giant detergent boxes.

In early 1977, Conroy went to work for Stiff Records, where he became the general manager working with the likes of Elvis Costello, Nick Lowe, Ian Dury, and Madness. Between 1985 and 1990, he was first Marketing Director and then Managing Director of the US labels division of WEA in London.

Conroy met Maxine Felstead in the music industry, and married her. In 1989, they had one son, Drew. Their marriage was short and they divorced a few years later. He went on to meet his second wife, Katie.

He then went on to become president of Chrysalis Records International from 1990 to 1992. Conroy joined Virgin Records UK as Managing Director in 1992 and was promoted to President in 1997 before leaving in early 2002. Successes included the Spice Girls, Meatloaf, Massive Attack, The Verve, and George Michael, helping make Virgin the number one label for many years.

Later in 2002, Conroy and his wife Katie, a former EMI International VP, launched Adventures in Music, which comprised three divisions - Adventure Records, Management, and Publishing, culminating in the Christmas number one in the UK in 2003 with a cover of the Tears for Fears song "Mad World" performed by Michael Andrew and Gary Jules. They were also the first label to win an Ivor Novello Award for that single.

Conroy served as chairman of the BRIT Awards committee starting in 1997. In 1999 Paul and his wife Katie had a daughter, Molly Paris. By 2000, and he was a longstanding member of the BPI Council, before stepping down in 2002.

Recent activity
In 2011, he encouraged the Wallingford Parish Church Choir to enter a national competition, in which they won to record an album for Decca Records.  He also served for a number of years on the Board of the Museum of Childhood in Bethnal Green, and more recently, Paul has acted as a consultant for Universal Music on issues related to catalogue artistes and the setting up of the website Udiscover and also consulted for leading advertising agencies in placement of music for various commercials. Conroy sold his boathouse home in Oxfordshire in the late 2010s and purchased a renovated hotel town house in Henley-on-Thames. As of 2020 he is selling the renovated hotel town house.  He also purchased a home in Gozo in 2017 and spends his time living between the UK and Gozo. He lives with his wife Katie and their daughter Molly and keeps regular contact with his son Drew, who has moved to the states. From Drews marriage to his second wife, American model Crystella Marie, 

Since 2002 to present he has been working as founder and CEO of Adventures in Music while helping his wife Katie with her company, Adventures in Living. He is an avid fan of Chelsea Football Club and makes sure that fact is rather obvious in the way that he and Katie decorate their homes.

References

External links
 Paul Conroy at Stiff Records photo by Adrian Boot
 Paul Conroy gets to be a Stiff Conroy talks about working at Stiff (video).

1949 births
Living people
British music industry executives